The Dongfeng EQ240/EQ2081 (export name Aeolus) is a 2.5 tonne capacity, six-wheel drive troop/cargo carrier truck developed and built by Dongfeng Motor Corporation, developed for and still used by the People's Liberation Army of the People's Republic of China for transport. The Dong Feng EQ2080/2081, together with the larger but visually similar EQ2100, are currently one of the most numerous troop carrying/cargo truck in service with the PLA.

History
The Dongfeng EQ240 first entered service with the PLA in 1975.

Design
The EQ2080/2081 is the 2,500 kg class chassis for workshop shelters in service with the Air Force and Navy, intended for operations in mountainous areas and over rough roads and tracks. The layout of the vehicle is entirely conventional, with the engine forward, the steel cab seating the driver and two passengers, and the load area to the rear. The standard cargo body has a steel and wood floor, steel side racks and a tailgate. Body options are stated to include dump, tanker and crane.

Optional equipment includes a power take-off and a 4,500 kg winch mounted behind the front bumper.

Variants

EQ240
The first vehicle produced by the Dongfeng Company, the petrol powered EQ240 entered service with the PLA in 1975.

EQ2080
In the 1990s, PLA authorities redesignated all truck references, and the vehicle became the EQ2080.

EQ2081
After Dongfeng agreed a diesel engine joint-venture with Cummins, the truck was redesignated as the EQ2081,  powered by a 6BT5.9 Turbo-charged diesel engine.

EQ2082E
The EQ2082E (or 2082E6D), is a Peruvian export version built to replace United States-built M35 series and Russian-built Ural 375 trucks. Peru received in excess of 400 trucks from Dong Feng between 1995-1998 carrying the designation.

Operators

 : People's Liberation Army
 : Peruvian Army
 : Sudan People's Armed Forces

References

EQ240 EQ2081
Military trucks of China
Military vehicles of the People's Republic of China